The 1979 World Series of Poker (WSOP) was a series of poker tournaments held at Binion's Horseshoe in Las Vegas, Nevada, USA.

Preliminary events

Main Event

There were 54 entrants to the main event. Each paid $10,000 to enter the tournament. Fowler was the first amateur to win the WSOP Main Event.

Final table

Performance of past champions
 Day 1: Doyle Brunson, Brian "Sailor" Roberts, Thomas "Amarillo Slim" Preston
 Day 2: Walter "Puggy" Pearson
 Day 3: Bobby Baldwin (1)

References

World Series of Poker
World Series of Poker